A special election was held in  on December 13, 1813 to fill a vacancy left by the resignation of William W. Bibb (DR) on November 6, 1813 after being elected to the Senate.

Election results

Cuthbert took his seat on February 7, 1814

See also
List of special elections to the United States House of Representatives

References

Georgia 1813 At-large
Georgia 1813 At-large
1813 At-large
Georgia At-large
1813 Georgia (U.S. state) elections
United States House of Representatives 1813 at-large
December 1813 events